The 9th Secretariat of the Communist Party of Vietnam (CPV), formally the 9th Secretariat of the Central Committee of the Communist Party of Vietnam (Vietnamese: Ban Bí thư Ban Chấp hành Trung ương Đảng Cộng sản Việt Nam Khoá IX), was partly elected by a decision of the 9th Politburo and partly elected by the 1st Plenary Session of the 9th Central Committee (CC) in the immediate aftermath of the 9th National Congress.

Members

References

Bibliography

9th Secretariat of the Communist Party of Vietnam